Welfare Reform Act is a stock short title used for legislation in the United Kingdom relating to social security benefits.

The Bill for an Act with this short title may have been known as a Welfare Reform Bill during its passage through Parliament.

List

United Kingdom
The Welfare Reform and Pensions Act 1999
The Welfare Reform Act 2007
The Welfare Reform Act 2009
The Welfare Reform Act 2012

Northern Ireland
The Welfare Reform Act (Northern Ireland) 2007
The Welfare Reform Act (Northern Ireland) 2010

United States
The Personal Responsibility and Work Opportunity Act is sometimes referred to as the Welfare Reform Act of 1996

See also
List of short titles

Lists of legislation by short title
Law of the United Kingdom
Social security in the United Kingdom